The 1992–93 season of the División de Honor de Futsal was the 3rd season of top-tier futsal in Spain. It was played in two rounds. At first round teams were drawn in two groups of 10/11 teams every one, advancing eight first to second round for title. Two/three last advanced to second round for permanence.

Regular season

1st round

Group Par

Group Impar

2nd round

Title – Group A

Title – Group B

Title – Group C

Title – Group D

Relegation group

Playoffs

See also
División de Honor de Futsal
Futsal in Spain

External links
1991–92 season at lnfs.es

1991 92
Spain
futsal